Yrjö Kalervo Leiwo (12 February 1884, Kuhmalahti - 12 January 1964) was a Finnish journalist, bank director and politician. At first active in the Finnish Party, he was later elected to the Parliament of Finland from 1930 to 1936 as a representative of the National Coalition Party.

References

1884 births
1964 deaths
People from Kangasala
People from Häme Province (Grand Duchy of Finland)
Finnish Party politicians
National Coalition Party politicians
Members of the Parliament of Finland (1930–33)
Members of the Parliament of Finland (1933–36)
20th-century Finnish journalists